The 2020–21 season was the 55th season of Denizlispor in existence and the club's second consecutive season in the top flight of Turkish football. In addition to the domestic league, Denizlispor participated in this season's editions of the Turkish Cup. The season covers the period from July 2020 to 30 June 2021.

Players

Current squad

|-
|colspan=12 align=center|Players sold or loaned out after the start of the season

Transfers

In

Out

Statistics

Pre-season and friendlies

Pre-season

Mid-season

Competitions

Overview

Süper Lig

League table

Results summary

Results by round

Matches

Turkish Cup

References

External links

Denizlispor football seasons
Denizlispor